FANS may refer to:

 the ICAO code for Nelspruit Airport
 a flight navigation system Future Air Navigation System

See also

 Fan (disambiguation), for the singular of FANs